Ercol is the name of a British furniture manufacturer. The firm dates back to 1920, when it was established in High Wycombe, Buckinghamshire, as Furniture Industries by Lucian Ercolani (1888–1976).

History

Origins
In 1944, Ercol was contracted by the government Board of Trade to produce 100,000 low-cost Windsor chairs – chairs with a bentwood frame and an arched back supporting delicate spindles. For the order to become commercial success, Ercol perfected the steam bending of wood in large quantities. The wood selected was English elm – a wood previously thought impossible to bend because it is distorted. Ercol's innovation meant the chair could be assembled from 14 pre-formed components, and mechanisation meant that a chair could be made every 20 seconds.

In 1946, Ercol exhibited its bentwood furniture at the Britain Can Make It exhibition, held at the Victoria and Albert Museum, London. In 1947, the first production-line Windsor chair, and other pieces from the range of Windsor furniture, went on sale. Ercol's mass-produced furniture found a ready market in post-war Britain, which demanded smaller pieces with simpler lines than their chunky pre-war counterparts. Ercol furniture was exhibited at the 1951 Festival of Britain, as it represented the latest style and fashion in furniture design and manufacture.

Modern day
In 2002 Ercol moved to a new purpose-built facility in Princes Risborough, Buckinghamshire, where it produces furniture made from North American elm and European ash, beech, oak and walnut from naturally regenerative forests.  This facility has won a number of awards for its architecture, design and environmental features.  The building's heat and hot water is provided from wood waste, whilst the company does not use solvent-based stains and lacquers, instead using the more environmentally friendly water-based versions. Ercol sources its fabrics from mills in Italy and Belgium, and offers a choice of over 100 different fabrics on its upholstery.  Ercol upholstery, with its solid wood frames, can generally have the cushions replaced when they wear out, prolonging the life of the suite.  It offers a reCover service to supply replacement cushions.

Ercol's ranges of upholstery, dining, cabinet and occasional furniture are on sale through a network of retailers in the UK, Europe, Japan and Korea and directly to other territories, whilst a range of ex-display and factory seconds are available from its factory outlet in Princes Risborough.  Ercol's Gina recliner was the first piece of domestic furniture to be awarded the Ergonomics Excellence award by FIRA, the UK furniture industry's independent furniture test house.  In 2008 Ercol launched two-bedroom ranges – Savona and Paladina – taking it back into the bedroom.

Ercol has been awarded the Manufacturing Guildmark by the Worshipful Company of Furniture Makers in recognition of its commitment to design and to quality of manufacture. Ercol's Treviso range was shortlisted for the annual Wood Awards held in the autumn of 2009.  In 2010 Ercol was awarded two Design Guild Marks by the Worshipful Company of Furniture Makers out of only twenty issued for the year.  The Design Guild Mark is issued by Worshipful Company of Furniture Makers – the industry's guild.  The guild mark is awarded "for excellence in the design of furniture.  It will mark and reward the work of the finest designers working in Britain." The first award was in recognition of the designs of the company's founder, Lucian Ercolani, embodied in the Originals range.  The Originals are a small collection of pieces reissued from Ercol's back catalogue.  The Old Man, as he is affectionately known within the company, trained as a furniture designer at Shoreditch Technical Institute, making his first piece of furniture in 1907. The Originals collection reflected a break from the heavy, ornate pre-war styles towards a new clean lined, simple elegance.  They were first launched in the late 1950s.

As well as its presence in UK retailers' stores, and its own showroom at its Princes Risborough facility, Ercol attends a number of trade and consumer exhibitions and holds a number of events at its showroom.  In 2009 Ercol will be exhibiting at the design show Trent London which is open to the public and in January 2010 at the national trade show at the NEC, Birmingham Interiors Birmingham.

Ercol partnered design magazine Wallpaper for one of the major installations at the 2009 London Design Festival – a modern interpretation of the Chair Arch, to be given pride of place in the Central Courtyard of the V&A Museum in September 2009.  In Victorian times towns would mark a particularly special occasion, such as the visit of a VIP, with an arch adorned with the town's main commodity.  The arch would then form the centre of festivities.  In 1877 High Wycombe, famous for its chair manufacturing, built a chair arch for the visit of Queen Victoria to Disraeli at his home, Hughenden Manor.  The idea originated with the Town Council, who deputised it to one of their members, Walter Skull, to organise through the Chair Manufacturers Association.  Just over fifty years later his company, Walter Skull & Son, would become part of Ercol.  Later arches were erected for the visit of Queen Elizabeth II in 1962 and for the Millennium.  The Ercol-Wallpaper arch will though be dramatically different.  Designed by Martino Gamper, it comprises two overlapping spans, all of the same chair – Ercol's stacking chair. After showing at the V&A it moved in 2010 to the V&A Museum of Childhood as part of their Sit Down! exhibition of children's seating through the years.

Sources 
 L. R. Ercolani A Furniture Maker: His Life, His Works and His Observations, (London: Ernest Benn, 1975)

External links 
 Ercol company website

1920 establishments in the United Kingdom
Companies based in Buckinghamshire
Manufacturing companies established in 1920
British furniture makers
Manufacturing companies of the United Kingdom
Woodworking
Wycombe District
British companies established in 1920
1920 establishments in England